Takeyoshi (written: 喬義 or 武能) is a masculine Japanese given name. Notable people with the name include:

 (born 1974), Japanese sumo wrestler
 (born 1929), Japanese photographer

Japanese masculine given names